is a temple of the Tendai sect in Miki, Hyōgo Prefecture, Japan.

Building list 
 Main hall (1610).
 Two-story pagoda (Tahōtō) (1648). 
 Misaka Ming shrine. 
 Middle Gate - (1651)
 Kaisan-do - (1656)
 Gyoja-do - (1630)
 Temple gate

Nationally Designated Important Cultural Property
There are four nationally designated cultural properties. 
 Bishamonten wooden statue
 Main hall
 Two-story pagoda
 Main shrine

Gallery

References

External links 

Tendai
Buddhist temples in Hyōgo Prefecture